Minco may refer to:
Minco, Oklahoma
Minco Products, a sensors, heaters and circuit board manufacturer